Calamobius filum is a species of beetle in the family Cerambycidae, and the only species in the genus Calamobius. It was described by Rossi in 1790.

References

Agapanthiini
Beetles described in 1790
Monotypic Cerambycidae genera